Titanic Memorial can refer to:

 Titanic Memorial, Belfast
 Memorial to the Engine Room Heroes of the Titanic, Liverpool
 Titanic Memorial (New York City)
 Titanic Engineers' Memorial, Southampton
 Titanic Memorial (Washington, D.C.)

See also
 Straus Park, in New York, memorializing Ida and Isidor Straus, who died on Titanic
 The Jack Phillips memorial cloister in Godalming, commemorating the radio operator who remained at his post while Titanic sank